USCGC Storis (WAGL-38/WAG-38/WAGB-38/WMEC-38) was a light icebreaker and medium endurance cutter which served in the United States Coast Guard for 64 years and 5 months, making her the oldest vessel in commission with the Coast Guard fleet at the time of her decommissioning.

World War II

The ship was laid down by the Toledo Shipbuilding Company of Toledo, Ohio, on 14 July 1941. Storis was launched on 4 April 1942 and commissioned on 30 September 1942 as an ice patrol tender. Initially assigned to the North Atlantic during World War II, Storis participated in the Greenland Patrols. She was tasked with patrolling the east coast of Greenland to prevent the establishment of German weather stations. During her first years, Storis operated in the very waters from which her name was derived. Originally to be named Eskimo, the U.S. Department of State objected to the name of the new cutter on the basis that the natives of Greenland would be offended by the name. "Storis" is a Scandinavian word meaning "great ice."

At 0510 on the 13th, dense black and yellow smoke was reported rising from the Escanaba. She sank at 0513. Storis and Raritan were ordered to investigate and rescue survivors while the rest of the convoy began zigzagging and steering evasive courses to avoid submarines. At 0715 the two cutters returned, having rescued 2 survivors and found the body of Lt. Robert H. Prause, which was on the Raritan. No explosion had been heard by the other escort vessels. The entire crew of 103 of the Escanaba was lost with the exception of these two men.

Post World War II career

Following the war, the homeport of Storis was changed from Boston to Curtis Bay, Maryland. On 15 September 1948, Storis was reassigned to Juneau, Alaska where she participated in the Bering Sea Patrol, which entailed delivering medical, dental and judicial services to isolated native villages in the far reaches of the territory. At the same time, Storis assisted in establishing Alaskan LORAN radio-navigation stations, provided supplies for the Distant Early Warning Line and conducted hydrographic surveys in the uncharted waters off the Arctic.

Shortly after her return in late 1957, the Storis was reassigned to her new homeport of Kodiak, Alaska.

In 1972, Storis underwent a major renovation converting her from a light icebreaker to a medium endurance cutter. With the change in designation, there also came a change in primary duties. The primary functions of Storis shifted to enforcing laws and treaties of the domestic and foreign fisheries in the Bering Sea and Gulf of Alaska. Storis underwent another major maintenance overhaul in 1986 that replaced her power plant and expanded her living quarters to include a new berthing area for women and a lounge for the crew.

Media

Storis participated in the rescue of the fishing vessel Alaskan Monarch, off Saint Paul Island, in March 1990. Video of this incident often appears on TV shows such as Deadliest Catch, to illustrate the dangers of working in Bering Sea waters. Storis also had a cameo in the 2006 film The Guardian.

Decommissioning

Storis was decommissioned in a ceremony in Kodiak on 8 February 2007.  The cutter then sailed to Alameda, California, where it was made ready for its immediate destination as part of the "Mothball Fleet" at Suisun Bay.

In July 2012 the nomination of the Storis for listing on the National Register of Historic Places was accepted by the State of California. It was formally listed on the Register on  31 December 2012.

On 12 June 2013 the Storis was put up for public auction by the General Services Administration with a starting bid of US$60,000 after an unforeseen "procedural difficulty" ended negotiations with the Storis Museum. However the auction failed to reach its reserve price when the auction closed on 27 June 2013. The Storis was towed on 25 October 2013 from California to Mexico where the ship was scheduled to be scrapped.

Awards
Coast Guard Presidential Unit Citation with Hurricane Device
Secretary of Transportation Outstanding Unit Award
Coast Guard Unit Commendation (8 awards)
Coast Guard Meritorious Unit Commendation (7 awards)
Coast Guard E Ribbon (11 awards)
Coast Guard Bicentennial Unit Commendation
American Campaign Medal
European-African-Middle Eastern Campaign Medal with one battle star
World War II Victory Medal
National Defense Service Medal with three service stars
Coast Guard Arctic Service Medal (8 awards)
Global War on Terrorism Service Medal
Humanitarian Service Medal
Special Operations Service Ribbon

See also

Victor Mature

Notes
Citations

References cited

External links 

Coast Guard Alaska News
National Trust for Historic Preservation online article about decommissioning the ship
Storis Museum, Juneau, AK
EN3 Tom Hough website

Medium endurance cutters
Icebreakers of the United States Coast Guard
1942 ships
Historic American Engineering Record in Alaska
National Register of Historic Places in Solano County, California
Ships on the National Register of Historic Places in California
Ships built by the Toledo Shipbuilding Company